People known by the epithet the Little include:

Amyntas II of Macedon, fifth century King of Macedon
Bagrat I of Imereti (died 1372), briefly ruler of the Kingdom of Imereti
Dionysius Exiguus (c. 470–c. 544), monk who invented the Anno Domini method of dating
Šćepan Mali (died 1773), ruler of Montenegro
Sigeberht the Little (died 653), King of Essex

See also
List of people known as the Small

Lists of people by epithet